Frances Dickinson (January 19, 1856 – May 19, 1945) was an American physician and clubwoman. She specialized in ophthalmology. Dickinson was the first woman received into the International Medical Congress (1887). In addition to being an active member of several medical societies, she was also characterized as a prominent woman's club participant, an enthusiastic worker in philanthropic enterprises, a writer, and a speaker. 

Dickinson graduated from Northwestern University Woman's Medical School, Chicago, 1883. She completed special courses in ophthalmology at Illinois Eye and Ear Infirmary, Royal Ophthalmic Hospital at Moorfields, London, Royal Free Hospital, Gray's Inn Road, London. She spent five months in Darmstadt, Germany, 1884, under private tutorship of Geheimrat Adolf Weber. She Interned at Mary Thompson Hospital, 1882 and was an Alternate interne at Cook County Hospital through the first examination open to women, 1883. She held various positions during her career including as ophthalmic surgeon to Mary Thompson Hospital; President and Dean of Harvey Medical College for ten years; Professor of ophthalmology and of angiology, Harvey Medical College; Professor of ophthalmology, Post-Graduate Medical College, Chicago.

Early life and family
Frances (nickname, "Fannie") Dickinson was born in Chicago, January 19, 1856. She was the daughter of Albert Franklin and Ann Eliza (Anthony) Dickinson. The father died in 1881. Her siblings included two sisters, Hannah (Mrs. Charles C. Boyles) and Melissa, and three brothers, Albert, Nathan and Charles. The brothers developed The Albert Dickinson Company of Chicago, which was the leading firm dealing in grass seeds the world over, a business which exemplified the organizing ability of Frances' family.

Many of Dickinson's maternal ancestors were physicians, and in the paternal line included a number of schoolmasters; and in both lines, ancestors frequently held public office. The Dickinsons came originally from Wales. Frances' grandfather, Samuel Dickinson, was the schoolmaster in his town, and one of the selectmen. Her father, Albert F. Dickinson, was a prominent business man in Chicago for many years, and from him, Frances received every encouragement when she announced her intention of adopting a profession for which he deemed women especially fitted. His wife, Ann Eliza Anthony, like himself a native of Massachusetts, was active in charitable work in her early home and, later, in the city of Chicago. She was one of the organizers of the First Society of Friends in that city. She was an aunt of the notable woman suffragist, Susan B. Anthony.

The first of the Anthony family of whom there is any record is William Anthony, who was born in Cologne, Germany, came to England during the reign of Edward VI, and was made Chief Engraver of the Royal Mint and Master of the Scales, continuing to hold that office through the reigns of that monarch and Mary, and part of the reign of Elizabeth. His crest and coat of arms were entered in the royal enumeration. Frances' line is traced through his son Derrick, who was the father of Dr. Francis Anthony, born in London in 1550. He was graduated at University of Cambridge with the degree of Master of Arts, and became famous as a physician and chemist. He was in continual conflict with the College of Physicians and Surgeons. Francis Anthony left a daughter and two sons, both of whom became distinguished as physicians, and John, the elder, founded the American branch of the family. His son, John Anthony, Jr., born in Hempstead, England, sailed for America in the ship Hercules, April 16, 1634, when 27 years old. He settled in Portsmouth, Rhode Island, where he was a landowner, innkeeper and one of the public officials. His family consisted of five children, who left 43 children, among whom was Abraham, the next in the line of descent. Abraham Anthony had thirteen children, one of whom, William Anthony, Jr., had four children, among whom was David. David married Judith Hicks, and they moved from Dartmouth, Massachusetts, and then to Berkshire, Massachusetts, settling near the Adams foot of Mount Greylock. They had a family of nine children, of whom Humphrey Anthony, the second son, born February 2, 1770, at Dartmouth, Massachusetts, was the father of Ann Eliza Anthony, mother of Frances. 

In her youth, Dickinson was associated with the Methodists, being one of the active workers in the Centenary Methodist Episcopal Church.

Education
Dickinson received her early education in the public schools of the city, graduating from the Central High School in 1875. For the four years ensuing, she was engaged as a teacher in the public schools, but finding the scope too limited, and having decided to enter the medical profession, she abandoned her first work for the broader field. During her last year as a public-school teacher, she attended a course of lectures on physiology given by Dr. Sarah Hackett Stevenson, at the Chicago Woman's Medical College. Her original purpose was to qualify herself to give instruction in that branch. A glimpse into the possibilities of the future determined her to take a complete course in medicine, and in this respect, she had an advantage over many who have entered untried fields, receiving the warmest encouragement and support from the members of her family, who made it possible for her to begin at once. Accordingly, in 1880, she matriculated at the Woman's Medical College of Chicago, where she took the full course, graduating in 1883, with honors. 

She served as Intern in the Women's and Children's Hospital, under Dr. Mary Harris Thompson. Having meanwhile resolved to make a specialty of Ophthalmology, she took the course in that branch at the Illinois State Eye and Ear Infirmary, Chicago. With the thoroughness characteristic of her work in every line, Dickinson concluded to continue her studies farther before entering upon independent practice.

In the fall of 1883, she went abroad with her brother, spending fourteen months as student and tourist in Scotland, England, France, Algiers, Tunis, Sicily, Switzerland and Germany. In London, she had the advantage of study under the surgeon, Dr. Cooper, in the Royal Ophthalmic Hospital at Moorfields, and also attended the ophthalmic clinics at the Royal Free Hospital, in Gray's Inn Road. While in Darmstadt, Germany, she was, for five months, under the private tutorship of Dr. Adolf Weber, who had a large private clinic and hospital of sixty beds attached to his home. This was the Weber to whom Albrecht von Graefe, the “father of Ophthalmology," willed his instruments.

Career
Since her return to Chicago, Dickinson was actively and successfully engaged in the practice of ophthalmology, in which she gained prominence within a brief period, and she was considered the leading woman practitioner in her specialty in the West. At one time, she enjoyed the distinction of being the only woman engaged as post-graduate instructor in Ophthalmology, filling that chair in the Chicago Post-Graduate School of Medicine. For some time, she was Secretary of Harvey Medical College, a co-educational institution, and later served as its President, where she also filled the Chair of Ophthalmology.

Dickinson was an active member of the City and State Medical Societies, and of the American Medical Association; of the Chicago Ophthalmological Society; the American Academy of Political and Social Science; and the Chicago Academy of Sciences. She was the first woman received into the International Medical Congress, in which she was admitted to membership at its ninth convention, held in 1887, at Washington, D.C. Since that year, women were been denied membership, in spite of the fact that the congresses were held in foreign cities where women were not allowed equal privileges with men at the universities.

Apart from the fact that she was one of the leading oculists of the western U.S., Dickinson was entitled to rank among the progressive women of the day for intellectual vigor displayed in her association with various good works. Her many philanthropic interests received the same attention as she gave to her regular professional work. 

During the World's Columbian Exposition, Dickinson was a member of the board of lady managers, and was indefatigable in her efforts in that connection. She and Waite, were the originators of the Queen Isabella Association, which was formed for the purpose of commemorating the labors of Queen Isabella in assisting and encouraging Christopher Columbus. The material result of their work was the beautiful statue executed by Harriet Hosmer.

Dickinson and Waite were also associated in another work of practical benefit. At the time of the Johnstown Flood, they formed the first medical union composed of women of the various schools of medicine—the Illinois Medical Women's Sanitary Association—which immediately sent Drs. Katharine Bushnell, Alice Ewing, and later Rachel Hickey, to the scene of the disaster. They were among the first on the ground to commence the work of relief, and remained there seven weeks.

She was an author of articles and pamphlets on Refraction, Education of Adults at Night, College Entrance Requirements, Fundamentals of Education, Organization, Vocational Education, Complete College and University Courses for Adults in the Evening, Pedagogy in Medical Schools. 

While in Chicago, Dickinson resided at the Auditorium Hotel.

Clubwoman

Dickinson served on the Member Board of Lady Managers, World's Columbian Exposition, Chicago, 1892-93. She was a Member of Chicago Physicians' Club, American Medical Association, Chicago Ophthalmological Society, Ninth International Medical Congress of Physicians and Surgeons, meeting at Washington in 1887 and first woman to be admitted to this International organization. Member of Chicago Woman's Club since 1886. 
She was a delegate to General Federation of Women's Clubs in 1900 at Milwaukee and in 1902, at Los Angeles, California. 

Dickinson also served as President of Social Economics Club for five successive years. In 1902, while in that role, she proposed making a study of marriage customs of all nations, of all times, hoping thus to cope with the problems of the times. She stated, "When people marry, they should have two contracts -- one to satisfy the demands of the church and the other a contract just among themselves. In it each should agree to release the other whenever called upon to do so."
She was a Member of American Association of Political Science; National Educational Association; Women's Medical Club; National Vocational Association; Women's Federal Labor Union No. 2703, 1887; Illinois Woman's Alliance (first delegated body of women in Chicago); Medical Women's Sanitary Association (first organization of physicians from all schools of medicine); member of the International Medical Woman's Congress at Chicago, 1893; Secretary Queen Isabella Association, World's Fair, Chicago; and Trustee Chicago Academy of Sciences. She was elected president of the Artcraft Institute Guild in 1914.

Later life
In 1906, in need to recuperate her health after a severe strain of overwork in Chicago, Dickinson removed to Florida. She was instrumental in opening a new field of commerce for the U.S. by inducing the Federal government to establish the camphor experiment station of the United States Department of Agriculture at Orange City, Florida. Her brother, Albert Dickinson, of Chicago, gave  in 1908 for the establishment of the station. Her homestead in Orange City was named, "Aranoana Lodge".

In July 1923, Dickinson was a delegate to the National Woman's Party conference in Seneca Falls, New York where the proposed Equal Rights Amendment was presented by Alice Paul. Dickinson, a cousin of Susan B. Anthony seconded the proposal.

Dickinson died in Orange City, May 19, 1945.

References

Attribution

Bibliography
 

1856 births
1945 deaths
19th-century American women physicians
19th-century American physicians
20th-century American women physicians
20th-century American physicians
19th-century American women writers
American medical writers
American founders
Clubwomen